Strangest Places is the second album by the singer-songwriter Abra Moore, released in 1997 by Arista Records. Moore was nominated for a Grammy Award for the single, "Four Leaf Clover".

Track listing
All songs written by Abra Moore, except as noted.
"Four Leaf Clover" – 3:32
"Don't Feel Like Cryin'" – 3:51
"Strangest Places" (Moore, Mitch Watkins) – 4:01
"Happiness" – 4:27
"Never Believe You Now" – 4:19
"Say It Like That" – 4:17
"Your Faithful Friend" – 3:07
"All I Want" – 3:52
"In Light of It All" – 3:50
"Keeps My Body Warm" – 4:06
"Guitar Song" – 5:00
"Summer's Ending" – 4:37

Personnel
Abra Moore – guitar, assistant engineering, tambourine, vocals
J. P. Allen – harmonica
Padraic Aubrey – mixing assistance
Jim Champagne – mixing assistance
Stewart Cochran – Hammond organ
Gene Elders – violin
Maude Gilman – art direction, art design
Wade Hunt – design
Dennis Keeley – photography
Jimmy LaFave – backing vocals
Brian Lee – mastering
Bob Ludwig – mastering
Lloyd Maines – steel guitar, slide guitar
Chris Maresh – bass guitar
Mike McCarthy – engineering
John Mills – clarinet, baritone saxophone
Jack Joseph Puig – mixing
Steve Schnur – A&R
Chris Searles – drums, percussion
Stuart Sullivan – engineering
Brannen Temple – drums
John Treanor – washboard
Mitch Watkins – bass guitar, cabasa, drum loop, engineering, acoustic and electric guitar, keyboards, production, programming, shaker

References

1997 albums
Abra Moore albums
Arista Records albums